Leesville is an unincorporated community in Henry County, in the U.S. state of Missouri.

History
Leesville was originally called "Tebo", and under the latter name was platted in 1854. A post office called Leesville was established in 1857, and remained in operation until 1918.  The present name is after Andrew Jackson Lee, an early settler.

References

Unincorporated communities in Henry County, Missouri
1854 establishments in Missouri
Unincorporated communities in Missouri